Palmitos is a district of the Naranjo canton, in the Alajuela province of Costa Rica.

History 
Palmitos was created on 16 October 2008 by Decreto Ejecutivo 34848-MG.

Geography 
Palmitos has an area of  km² and an elevation of  metres.

Demographics 

For the 2011 census, Palmitos had a population of  inhabitants.

Transportation

Road transportation 
The district is covered by the following road routes:
 National Route 148
 National Route 706
 National Route 726

References 

Districts of Alajuela Province
Populated places in Alajuela Province